Francis Cunningham may refer to:
 Francis Cunningham (Indian Army officer) (1820–1875), British Indian Army officer
 Francis Cunningham (painter) (born 1931), American artist 
 Francis A. Cunningham (1804–1864), U.S. Representative from Ohio
 Francis M. Cunningham (1837–1919), American Civil War soldier

See also
Frank Cunningham (disambiguation)